A Romance of Mayfair is a 1925 British romance film directed by Thomas Bentley and starring Betty Faire, Henry Victor and Molly Johnson. It was based on the novel The Crime of Constable Kelly by J.C. Snaith and made by Stoll Pictures at their Cricklewood Studios. The screenplay concerns the love affair between the heir to a Duke and a young actress.

Premise
The love affair between the heir to a Duke and a young actress is almost ruined because of the gulf in class between them.

Cast
 Betty Faire - Mary Lawrence 
 Henry Victor - Jack Dinneford 
 Molly Johnson - Lady Blanche 
 Fred Raynham - Sir Dugald MacLean 
 Edward O'Neill - Duke of Bridport 
 George Foley - Sergeant Kelly 
 Temple Bell - Millie Wren 
 Reginald Bach - Lord Wrexham 
 Gertrude Sterroll - Lady Wargrave 
 Eva Westlake - Mrs. Wren

References

External links
 

1925 films
1920s English-language films
Films directed by Thomas Bentley
1920s romance films
Films based on British novels
Films set in London
Films set in England
British silent feature films
British black-and-white films
Stoll Pictures films
British romance films
Silent romance films
1920s British films